Top of the Town was a 1950s radio programme, broadcast on the BBC Light Programme and hosted by Terry-Thomas.

The pilot episode was broadcast on 5 June 1953 on the BBC Home Service; the first series started shortly afterwards, on 1 November 1953, and was broadcast weekly on the BBC Light Programme for sixteen episodes, until 21 February 1954.  A second series was commissioned and ran in weekly episodes for 16 weeks between 31 October 1954 and 27 February 1955.

References

Bibliography

BBC Light Programme programmes
BBC Home Service programmes